Gleb Nikolayevich Panfyorov (born 29 May 1970) is a former Russian professional footballer.

Club career
He made his professional debut in the Soviet Second League in 1989 for FC Chayka-CSKA Moscow. He played for the main team of PFC CSKA Moscow in the USSR Federation Cup.

He made his Russian Premier League debut for FC Asmaral Moscow on 1 April 1992 in a game against FC Zenit Saint Petersburg. He also played in the Russian Premier League for FC KAMAZ Naberezhnye Chelny, FC Torpedo Moscow and FC Zhemchuzhina Sochi.

Honours
 Latvian Higher League runner-up: 2000.

References

1970 births
Footballers from Moscow
Living people
Soviet footballers
Association football midfielders
Russian footballers
Russian Premier League players
FC Spartak Moscow players
PFC CSKA Moscow players
FC SKA Rostov-on-Don players
FC Asmaral Moscow players
FC KAMAZ Naberezhnye Chelny players
FC Torpedo Moscow players
FC Torpedo-2 players
FC Zhemchuzhina Sochi players
FC Moscow players
Fortuna Düsseldorf players
FK Ventspils players
FK Dinamo Samarqand players
Russian expatriate footballers
Expatriate footballers in Germany
Expatriate footballers in Uzbekistan
Expatriate footballers in Latvia
Russian expatriate sportspeople in Latvia
FC Sheksna Cherepovets players
FC Spartak Kostroma players